Demodex criceti is a hair follicle mite found in the epidermis of the Syrian hamster, Mesocricetus auratus.

References

Trombidiformes
Animals described in 1958